The 1942 election to the Baseball Hall of Fame was the first election that was conducted in three years. The Baseball Writers' Association of America (BBWAA) voted by mail to select from 20th century players and elected Rogers Hornsby.

This was the only election or committee meeting scheduled between 1939 and 1945, as the hall of fame had inducted its required number of ten players from the 20th century following the 1939 election; the United States was involved in World War II during that time. The only other activities were the special election of Lou Gehrig following his 1939 farewell and the prompt election of Commissioner Landis following his death late in 1944.

After the grand opening
After the National Baseball Museum opened in 1939, it remained to be determined how the membership in its Hall of Fame would be determined in the future. The Baseball Writers' Association of America (BBWAA) had determined to vote every three years rather than annually, although it had voted in a special election to consider Lou Gehrig. That move was a widely criticized, as observers generally agreed that it was a good pace to elect about three recent players annually, as from 1936 to 1939.

After the Centennial Committee made six selections in 1939 from the figures of the 19th century, baseball's Commissioner Landis completely revised the committee's membership, designating it the Hall of Fame Committee and establishing it as the institution's permanent governing body. From 1939 to 1944 its four members were Athletics owner and manager Connie Mack, Yankees president Ed Barrow, Braves president Bob Quinn, and sportswriter Sid Mercer. This committee was responsible, in its function as the Old-Timers Committee, for selecting additional worthy candidates from the 19th century, but it never convened during this 5-year period, and thereby selected no one. Inaction fostered greater complaints that the stars of the 1880s and 1890s were being ignored. The relative slight was tiny because the baseball writers voted only once between 1939 and 1945 and elected only one recent player.

BBWAA election

Members of the BBWAA again had the authority to select any players active in the 20th century, provided they had been retired for one year. Voters were instructed to cast votes for 10 candidates; any candidate receiving votes on at least 75% of the ballots would be honored with induction to the Hall.

A total of 233 ballots were cast, with 2,328 individual votes for 72 specific candidates, an average of 9.99 per ballot; 175 votes were required for election. Players of the 1900s and 1910s, who many voters felt should be given priority, dominated the voting to an even greater extent than they had in 1939. Of the top 22 candidates in the voting, 17 had not seen any substantial play since 1917; only 3 of the top 32 had played their final season anytime between 1918 and 1933. Players who had been retired over 24 years – 42 of the 72 named – received 66% of the votes. The results were announced in January 1942. The sole candidate who received at least 75% of the vote and was elected is indicated in bold italics; candidates who have since been selected in subsequent elections are indicated in italics:

References

External links
 1942 Election at www.baseballhalloffame

Baseball Hall of Fame balloting
1942 in baseball